Maritime anti-corruption initiatives have emerged in the last decade as a response to the growing threat of transnational corruption in the maritime domain, specifically the shipping industry. While historically, national authorities would handle corruption domestically, the increasingly international nature of shipping and corruption have led to private and public actors engaging in collective initiatives, typically manifesting through the work of the Maritime Anti-Corruption Network.

Corruption in the Maritime Domain 
Elements of the maritime industry like seaports and terminals have always been important areas of social and economic opportunities. Ports are key strategic sectors, playing key economic, internal and international security roles for both developed and developing countries. The strategic importance of ports and other maritime resources have led to the industry being criticized by Maersk, a major shipping company, as “an environment where facilitation payments and extortion are common occurrences.”  In the EU specifically, coastal regions and major sea ports have shown to present the highest risks of corruption. Europe's coastal borders have increasingly been subject to corruption pressure by smugglers in the past few years. In addition, border guards and local government officials are often involved in corruption schemes related to cross-border trade. Typically, in European small coastal towns, the corruption of border guards is often related to corruption in local authorities. Several ports in Europe have been identified by the Center for the Study of Democracy as having extreme vulnerability to corruption pressures:

 Greece: 
 Patra Port
 Igoumenititsa Port
 Pireaeus Port
 Spain: 
 Port of Meililla
 Ceuta Port
 Blue borders near Galicia
 France:
 Marseille-Porto Vecchio Sea Port

There are several possible causes of this dangerous environment, and many point to the very nature of the shipping industry. Frequent port calls all over the world, each country with different laws and regulations, mixed with heavy bureaucracy leaves the crews of these ships exposed to abuses of power and demands for illicit payments by the port authorities and government officials. The Conference of Business Integrity listed several factors that contribute to the shipping industry's struggle with corruption:

 The presence or lack of clear procedures in any areas of port operation;
 Exercise of discretionary powers by customs officers and other port agencies;
 Existence or absence of a system of bottlenecks made possible due to wide discretionary powers of port officials (and the likelihood of these being used to create extortion opportunities);
 Payments for services not rendered by port agencies;
 Availability or absence of complaints/feedback desks/redress mechanisms and the effectiveness of such where available 

These challenges have led to companies and organizations calling for the establishment of a strategic framework for a more transparent and consistent port or terminal system. However, major challenge when governments or organizations attempt to implement this kind of strategic framework is the current lack of clear procedures backed up by laws as well as the discretionary power of custom officers and other port authorities. Even when there are established transparent and consistent procedures, officials have still been able to use discretion on assessing access or noncompliance fees. This is a major challenge that the companies conducting business in Nigeria have encountered. Although policies may be put into place by national authorities, individual officer non-compliance is a major issue to the extent that the National Port Authority as an organization becomes incompetent in effective management of ports. One way that the National Port Authority has tried to gain some sense of control and awareness of how much corruption is really going on is the implementation of grievance mechanisms. However, only 73% of ports/terminals customers have ever actually used these grievance mechanisms. The inability for national authorities to control the issue of corruption on their own has led to an increasing number of collective action initiatives that combine private companies, regional organizations, and national/local governments as the main actors. These initiatives are typically manifested through the MACN.

Maritime Anti-Corruption Network (MACN) 
The Maritime Anti-Corruption Network can best be defined as a certifying business coalition, a coalition between competitors that arguably enhances the strongest degree of fairness between stakeholders by forcing companies to actively create a level playing field.  The Maritime Anti-Corruption Network, or MACN, can best be defined as a certifying business coalition, a coalition between competitors that arguably enhances the strongest degree of fairness between stakeholders by forcing companies to actively create a level playing field. The MACN was founded by the Business for Social Responsibility in 2011, triggered by the adoption of the U.K Bribery Act which obliged companies to have ‘adequate procedures’ in place to prevent bribery. Participating in a collective action like MACN can itself be considered a preventative action, so it was a rational choice for many companies wishing to avoid prosecution for inadequate anti-bribery measures.  Although MACN is primarily business driven, its strategy emphasizes collaboration with national and local authorities. 

The MACN is a self-described global business network with the mission of working towards the elimination of all forms of maritime corruption. This mission includes several goals, including raising awareness of corruption challenges; implementing anti-corruption principles; developing and sharing best practices; collaborating with governments, NGOs, and civil society to combat the root causes of corruption; and finally create a 'culture of integrity' within the entire maritime community.

MACN has established a strategy for achieving these goals that they have named "The Three Cs":

 Capacity Building 
 Focuses on monitoring threats, information sharing, and strengthening internal compliance management of its member companies
 Collective Action
 Building sustainable collaborations with governments in order to strengthen accountability across the maritime sector and increase member participation
 Culture of Integrity
 Collaborate with key stakeholders and engage in open dialogue to promote integrity culture and increase awareness of industry challenges

These strategies have been used for the development of several collective actions which have focused on the  implementation of new standard operating procedures (SOPs), the creation of an anonymous incident reporting mechanism, and development of an integrity training toolkit.  The collective action initiatives in question have taken place in Nigeria, Argentina, Egypt, Indonesia, and most recently in India.

Collective Action Initiatives

Nigeria 
The collective action initiative between the MACN and the Convention on Business Integrity, an internationally recognized NGO which specializes in West African ethics and anti-corruption, was developed in 2011 to promote integrity and good governance in Nigeria's ports.  It was developed with a multi-stakeholder approach in mind, where national port authorities, members of the maritime industry and customs officers would have an opportunity to affect the area in which they worked.  The focus of this initiative was to implement face-to-face integrity training, harmonize regulations, and establish grievance mechanisms for each port to offer to captains.  Nigeria is recognized as one of the most challenging countries to do business because of the major risk of facilitation requests and the possibility of extortion, harassment, and threats in the case of a company refusing to pay.  The initial survey taken by the MACN showed that frequent demands were made by government agencies, primarily in major ports like Lagos Apapa and Lagos Tin Can. The project was set up in collaboration of the two previously mentioned organisations and several Nigerian anti-corruption agencies: Independent Corrupt Practices Commission (ICPC); Technical Unit on Governance and Anti-Corruption Reforms (TUGAR); Bureau for Public Procurement (BPP); and the Economic and Financial Crimes Commission.

2012 to 2014 marked the risk assessment and scoping stage of the initiative. This stage consisted of identifying forms of corruption, drivers and possible solutions.  The risk assessment focused on the ports of Apapa and Tin Can in Lagos, Port Harcourt, Onne, Calabar, and Warri.  This assessment highlighted several key risks throughout Nigeria:

 Weak internal ethics infrastructure
 Insufficiently defined SOPs for port calls
 Underdeveloped complaint investigation structures and enforcement practices
 A lack of coordination among government agencies
 Broad discretionary powers for authorities
 Indications of state capture and monopoly (In Onne and Warri specifically)

2015-2017 was the implementation stage.  The outcomes of this stage included improved transparency of regulation, strengthened governance frameworks, and an increased stakeholder capacity for anti-corruption management.  In 2017, an impact assessment was taken using both qualitative and quantitative data to evaluate changes in incident data as well as qualitative perceptions from industry players and government stakeholders.  The implementation of the initiative had a quite positive national reception with a high level of support from the presidency.  The government approval was shown through the Vice President's participation in a launch event of the Port Service Support Portal and Accountability Mechanism.

In June 2019, it was announced that the MACN was to strengthen port enforcement, embarking on a partnership with the Danish Ministry of Foreign Affairs (MOFA) to develop a Global Port Integrity Index and scale up its collective action activities in West Africa.  The Global Port Integrity Index will be based on first-hand data gathered from MACN's anonymous incident reporting mechanism.  The scaling up of West African collective action will include working further with international and local maritime organisations as well as Nigerian government authorities so that they can improve the overall maritime climate, reducing maritime corruption.  As Denmark is a large player in the international maritime sector, MOFA will be involved in a global anti-corruption program extending support to all levels of public and private level stakeholders.

Argentina 
In 2014, after analyzing data from its anonymous incident reporting mechanism, MACN recognized Argentina as a primary area for recurring reports of facilitation requests during the vessel clearing process.  Although every cargo ship entering Argentine waters must pass inspections, including those by the Servicio Nacional Sanidad y Calidad Agroalimentaria  (an Argentine agency that guarantees the quality and healthiness of agricultural products), several problematic incentives were identified for undermining integrity:

 Inspections were at the discretion of inspectors;
 Failing an inspection is costly for both parties;
 Recording inspections with paper records makes data aggregation extremely difficult ;
 Systems lack reliable reporting mechanisms for companies seeking to counter alleged non-compliance

Therefore, the focus of this initiative was to redraft regulations of a vessel's holds for the loading of agricultural products and develop a new IT system for processing and registering holds/inspections.  For this project, MACN has teamed up with its local partner, Governance Latam, a Buenos Aires law firm specializing in compliance and anti-corruption.  Part of the strategy for this initiative was interviewing over 40 MACN members, port agents, private surveyors, public inspectors, maritime lawyers, maritime insurance officials, representatives of grain houses, and public officials to get a baseline risk assessment.  This broad range of actors was used to ensure a balance between the commercial interests of private stakeholders and the foreign policy interests of Argentina's public domain.  As in the Nigeria initiative, the objective of this was to modernize inspection systems to be less discretionary and more transparent.

This initiative so far has been a success in implementing a new regulatory framework that:

 Reduces discretion in the inspection of holds and tanks;
 Establishes a system of cross-checks to increase integrity;
 Provides an escalation process when disputes occur;
 Creates an e-governance system to underpin the framework 

Since the implementation of the new regulatory framework, an influx of funding has enabled Governance Latam to carry out training to hundreds of local, private, and public stakeholders, with SENASA establishing the course as official government training material through its Resolution No.693-E/2017.

Egypt 
In 2015, MACN developed an initiative in Egypt aimed at combating challenges in Suez Canal transits.  The primary focus of this initiative is to encourage captains passing through the Suez Canal to refuse bribery demands.  So far, the impacts of this initiative have been a decrease in the frequency of demands, higher number of refusals of demands by captains, and a small development of MACN toolkit use across Africa Operations.  MACN has not published any in-depth impact reports on their work in Egypt yet, but "Collective Action in Egypt" was a topic on the agenda at the 2019 MACN Annual Member Meeting in London.

Indonesia 
MACN initiated its collective action initiative in Indonesia in 2015 with a focus on improving tracker IT systems, promoting e-governance systems for cashless export licenses, integrating whistle-blowing procedures, and establishing a forum for discussing and raising awareness about anti-corruption laws and regulations.  The project was implemented with support from the Indonesian NGO Kemitraan and the U.K. Foreign Commonwealth Office, co-financed by the UKFCO and MACN.  The initial risk assessment gathered that there is a high risk of corruption in ports, with frequent occurrence of illicit facilitation payments.  Companies that refuse these payments are typically penalized in some way, whether with delays or non-compliance fees.  A key challenge to the initiative was the ambiguous laws and regulations. President Joko Widodo sought to improve performance by improving these regulations and making investments into infrastructure.

Indonesia's ambition to invest and build a more competitive maritime sector by tackling corruption attracted several stakeholders from both the private and public sector.  The key stakeholders involved include:

 DG Customs & Excise
 PT Pelindo II
 Corruption Eradication Commission
 UKFCO
 Kemitraan and Civil Society
 MACN member companies

The UKFCO has served as the primary public actor aside from the Indonesian government.  Their involvement is motivated by the British agenda to combat corruption through private sector engagement, as evidenced by both the 2010 U.K. Bribery Act and 2014 U.K. Anti-Corruption Plan.  Therefore, a main objective of the initiative is to increase the ease of doing business for British, international and local businesses which operate in Indonesia.  Additional objectives include increasing transparency of port operations and the removal of trade barriers.

The prevalence of corrupt officials in Tanjung Priok Port, the main port in Jakarta, creates an immediate objective to implement transparent regulations and address integrity risks.  The key transparency risks identified by the initiative are the lack of transparent SOPs in Tanjung Priok as well as the tendency for the vessel departure process to rely on cash payments without any receipts, which make corruption and exploitation virtually impossible to detect unless reported.  In addition, the whistleblowing systems developed by DG customs and IPC Pelindo II are not used by members of Indonesia's industry, and the systems that are used are quite deficient.

Therefore, the key actors of the initiative identified several high level actions to be taken in either a short or long term timeframe:

 Short Term:
 PT Pelindo II - establish improved and transparent tracking IT systems
 All Stakeholders - establish a stakeholder forum for government agencies and members of the maritime industry to discuss integrity challenges
 DG Customs - raise awareness about SOPs and regulations
 Long Term
 All Stakeholders - integrate whistle-blowing reporting into existing processes and procedures
 DG Customs & MACN - support the establishment of cashless systems for fees

Overall, this initiative has so far improved the transparency of importing and exporting regulations through Tanjung Priok port.  In addition, the improved dialogue between the public and private sector has increased accountability and responsiveness of key Indonesian government stakeholders.

India 
In 2019, it was announced that the Government of India would engage in a collective action with MACN, international organisations, and industry stakeholders.  This initiative would include the implementation of integrity training for port officials and establishment of clear escalation and reporting procedures.  The overall strategic goal is to reduce and eventually eliminate bottlenecks to trade and other integrity issues during port operations.

See also 
 ISO 37001 Anti-bribery management systems
 Group of States Against Corruption
 International Anti-Corruption Academy
 United Nations Convention against Corruption
 OECD Anti-Bribery Convention

External Links 
 https://macn.dk

References 

Corruption
Maritime security of India
Anti-corruption measures in India
Maritime safety
Port authorities
Anti-corruption non-governmental organizations